William Barnes (March 5, 1876 – December 16, 1925) was a Canadian sport shooter. Competing for Canada, he won a silver medal in team clay pigeons at the 1924 Summer Olympics in Paris.

References

1876 births
1925 deaths
Sportspeople from Hamilton, Ontario
Canadian male sport shooters
Olympic shooters of Canada
Olympic silver medalists for Canada
Shooters at the 1924 Summer Olympics
Olympic medalists in shooting
Medalists at the 1924 Summer Olympics
20th-century Canadian people